Kubrat Knoll (Kubratova Mogila \ku-'bra-to-va mo-'gi-la\) is a rocky peak of elevation 140 m at the base of Inott Point, Varna Peninsula on eastern Livingston Island in the South Shetland Islands, Antarctica.  It is named after Khan Kubrat, 632-668 AD, who founded the Kingdom of Great Bulgaria on the territory bounded by the Caucasus, Volga and the Carpathians in 632 AD.

Location

Maps
 L.L. Ivanov et al. Antarctica: Livingston Island and Greenwich Island, South Shetland Islands. Scale 1:100000 topographic map. Sofia: Antarctic Place-names Commission of Bulgaria, 2005.
 L.L. Ivanov. Antarctica: Livingston Island and Greenwich, Robert, Snow and Smith Islands. Scale 1:120000 topographic map.  Troyan: Manfred Wörner Foundation, 2009.

References
 Kubrat Knoll. SCAR Composite Antarctic Gazetteer
 Bulgarian Antarctic Gazetteer. Antarctic Place-names Commission. (details in Bulgarian, basic data in English)

External links
 Kubrat Knoll. Copernix satellite image

Hills of Livingston Island